is a Japanese football player. He plays for Kataller Toyama.

Club statistics
Updated to 23 February 2018.

References

External links

Profile at Yokohama FC
Profile at Kataller Toyama

1992 births
Living people
Sanno Institute of Management alumni
Association football people from Chiba Prefecture
Japanese footballers
J2 League players
J3 League players
Yokohama FC players
Kataller Toyama players
Association football defenders